Qarkhelar (also Romanized as Qerkhlār and Qerekhlar; also known as Kirkhiar, Kyrkhlar, Kirkhlar, Qahveh Khāneh-ye Qerekhlār, Qerkhlār Zanjīreh, and Zanjīreh) is a village in Koshksaray Rural District, in the Central District of Marand County, East Azerbaijan Province, Iran. At the 2006 census, its population was 44, in 13 families.

References 

Populated places in Marand County